Stephen Payne (born 1 August 1975) is an English former footballer, He signed for FC Halifax Town in July 2008 but his first season was blighted by injury. Steve returned for the 2009–2010 season and played an integral part as FC Halifax Town won the league, wearing the captain's armband for most of it. His final game was against Skelmersdale United at The Shay when he was substituted with a few minutes to go so the rest of the players, management and supporters could pay tribute to his fantastic effort in football.

Stephen started his playing career at Huddersfield Town.

Payne scored the 1st goal for Macclesfield Town in their 3-1 FA Trophy final victory over Northwich Victoria on 19 May 1996.

External links

1975 births
Living people
Sportspeople from Castleford
English footballers
Association football defenders
Macclesfield Town F.C. players
Chesterfield F.C. players
Northwich Victoria F.C. players
Stalybridge Celtic F.C. players
FC Halifax Town players
Huddersfield Town A.F.C. players